Urban Behavior also spelled Behaviour is a unisex apparel retailer in Canada with a focus on club wear. The chain was founded in 1989 by Arif Noor. and has since been acquired by YM Inc.

The store is mostly popular with people trying to keep up with today’s fashion trend. Urban Behavior's target market are teenage to young adult consumers with focus on affordability.

History

Urban Behavior had stores located all across Canada, Eastern United States, and the Middle East. All mall based stores operate as unisex locations. The outlet locations in Toronto were divided along male and female clothing lines.

In July 2008, CMT America Corporation, Urban Behavior's corporate parent in the United States, filed for Chapter 11 bankruptcy. Many of the US stores have subsequently been closed. The company has maintained its Canadian stores and continues a wholesale presence in the United States.

In June 2011, CMT Canada, Urban Behavior's corporate parent, filed a Notice of Intention to Make a Proposal (“NOI”) pursuant to the provisions of the Bankruptcy and Insolvency Act (“BIA”).  The NOI is a restructuring process and did not proceeded to a liquidation or bankruptcy of the retailer. Approximately 24 of the existing 120 store locations across Canada were planned to be closed by August 31.

YM Inc. acquired Urban Behaviour in 2011.  It is now a sub-brand of Urban Planet, with 22 stores in Canada as of February 2021.

References

External links
 The Internet Fashion Database

Companies based in Toronto
Clothing companies established in 1989
Retail companies established in 1989
Clothing brands of Canada
Clothing retailers of Canada